Hanley Hills is a village in St. Louis County, Missouri, United States. The population was 2,101 at the 2010 census.

Geography
Hanley Hills is located at  (38.686251, -90.326371).

Demographics

2010 census
As of the census of 2010, there were 2,101 people, 867 households, and 571 families living in the village. The racial makeup of the village was 12.0% White, 85.3% African American, 0.1% Native American, 0.4% Asian, 0.3% from other races, and 1.9% from two or more races. Hispanic or Latino of any race were 1.3% of the population.

There were 867 households, of which 34.1% had children under the age of 18 living with them, 23.3% were married couples living together, 36.4% had a female householder with no husband present, 6.1% had a male householder with no wife present, and 34.1% were non-families. 29.3% of all households were made up of individuals, and 7.7% had someone living alone who was 65 years of age or older. The average household size was 2.42 and the average family size was 2.95.

The median age in the village was 38.1 years. 25.1% of residents were under the age of 18; 8.9% were between the ages of 18 and 24; 25.8% were from 25 to 44; 30.9% were from 45 to 64; and 9.2% were 65 years of age or older. The gender makeup of the village was 44.6% male and 55.4% female.

2000 census
As of the census of 2000, there were 2,124 people, 864 households, and 582 families living in the village. The racial makeup of the village was 21.61% White, 76.74% African American, 0.05% Native American, 0.14% Asian, 0.19% from other races, and 1.27% from two or more races. Hispanic or Latino of any race were 0.47% of the population.

There were 864 households, out of which 32.5% had children under the age of 18 living with them, 31.1% were married couples living together, 30.7% had a female householder with no husband present, and 32.6% were non-families. 28.8% of all households were made up of individuals, and 9.0% had someone living alone who was 65 years of age or older. The average household size was 2.46 and the average family size was 3.01.

In the village, the population was spread out, with 27.0% under the age of 18, 9.1% from 18 to 24, 30.0% from 25 to 44, 24.1% from 45 to 64, and 9.7% who were 65 years of age or older. The median age was 36 years. For every 100 females, there were 77.1 males. For every 100 females age 18 and over, there were 70.1 males.

The median income for a household in the village was $33,802, and the median income for a family was $37,368. Males had a median income of $30,833 versus $25,969 for females. The per capita income for the village was $15,906. About 6.3% of families and 9.3% of the population were below the poverty line, including 11.8% of those under age 18 and 7.7% of those age 65 or over.

References

Villages in St. Louis County, Missouri
Villages in Missouri